In marketing, the term atmospherics is used to describe the discipline of designing commercial spaces. Atmospherics was coined by Philip Kotler in a 1973 article in the Journal of Retailing. 

Kotler argues that the tangible product is only a small part of the total consumption package. Buyers respond to the total product, which includes services, warranties, packaging, advertising, financing, pleasantries, images and so on. Atmospherics covers three major art forms important to retail: architecture: exterior structure, interior design, and the design of window displays. The atmosphere of a commercial space performs three functions: creating attention, messages (communication) and affect.

The term atmosphere is a term borrowed from architecture. Space is designed to make people feel a certain way. This is apparent in cathedrals, which inspire a feeling of spiritual awe.

Kotler provides two definitions of atmospherics. It is the "conscious designing of space to create certain effects in buyers" or more precisely, "the effort to design buying environments to produce specific emotional effects in the buyer that enhance purchase probability".

Atmospherics is a qualitative construct that encompasses four of the main senses, with the exclusion of taste. The atmosphere of a commercial space can be divided into the intended atmosphere: the designed space; and the perceived atmosphere: the consumer's perception of that space. 

Atmospherics is a relevant marketing tool where the product is purchased or consumed and where the seller has design options. These are generally retail spaces such as shops and restaurants, but also libraries, religious buildings, civic buildings and so on. 

Atmospherics is more relevant as the number of competitive outlets increases and where product or price differences are small. Kotler presents atmospherics as an important concept in the positioning of the value offering. Atmospherics is also considered more relevant where products and services are targeted at specific buyer groups.

Kotler proposes a causal chain, connecting atmosphere and purchase probability:
 Sensory qualities of space surrounding purchase object
 Buyer's perception of the sensory qualities
 Effect of perceived sensory qualities
 Impact of buyer's modified information and affective state

See also 
 Servicescape

References 
 

Retail processes and techniques